Pornpun Guedpard is the captain and a member of the Thailand women's national volleyball team.

Clubs
  Chang (2011–2012)
  Nonthaburi (2011–2013)
  Sisaket (2013–2014)
  Bangkok Glass (2014–2017)
  Jakarta PGN Popsivo Polwan (2018–2019)
  Thai-Denmark Khonkaen Star (2019–2020)
  Toyota Auto Body Queenseis (2020–2021)
  Jakarta PGN Popsivo Polwan (2021–2022)
  CS Rapid Bucuresti (2022–2023)

Awards

Individuals
 2015 Asian Club Championship – "Best Setter"
 2015 CH7 University Championship – "Most Valuable Player"
 2016 Thai-Denmark Super League – "Most Valuable Player"
 2016 Asian Club Championship – "Best Setter"
 2017 VTV Binh Dien International Cup – "Best Setter"
 2020 Thailand League – "Best Setter"
 2022 Indonesian Proliga - "Best Setter"
 2022 AVC Cup for Women - "Best Setter"

Clubs

 2011–12 Thailand League –  Champion, with Nakornnonthaburi
 2012–13 Thailand League –  Runner-up, with  Nakornnonthaburi
 2013–14 Thailand League –  Runner-up, with Sisaket
 2014–15 Thailand League –  Champion, with Bangkok Glass
 2015–16 Thailand League –  Champion, with Bangkok Glass
 2016–17 Thailand League –  Runner-up, with Bangkok Glass
 2015 Thai-Denmark Super League –  Champion, with Bangkok Glass
 2016 Thai-Denmark Super League –  Champion, with Bangkok Glass
 2017 Thai-Denmark Super League –  Runner-up, with Bangkok Glass
 2018 Thai-Denmark Super League –  Runner-up, with Bangkok Glass
 2012 Asian Club Championship –  Bronze medal, with Chang
 2015 Asian Club Championship –  Champion, with Bangkok Glass
 2016 Asian Club Championship –  Bronze medal, with Bangkok Glass
2018–19 Indonesian Proliga –  Champions, with Jakarta Popsivo
2019 Thai-Denmark Super League –  Bronze medal, with Thai-Denmark Khonkaen Star
2020 Thailand League –  Runner-up, with Khonkaen Star
 2022 Indonesian Proliga -  3rd place, with Jakarta Mandiri Popsivo Polwan

Royal decorations
 2013 -  Commander (Third Class) of The Most Exalted Order of the White Elephant

References

External links

1993 births
Living people
Pornpun Guedpard
Pornpun Guedpard
Thai expatriate sportspeople in Indonesia
Thai expatriate sportspeople in Japan
Thai expatriate sportspeople in Romania
Expatriate volleyball players in Indonesia
Expatriate volleyball players in Japan
Expatriate volleyball players in Romania
Pornpun Guedpard
Universiade medalists in volleyball
Pornpun Guedpard
Southeast Asian Games medalists in volleyball
Competitors at the 2013 Southeast Asian Games
Competitors at the 2015 Southeast Asian Games
Competitors at the 2017 Southeast Asian Games
Universiade bronze medalists for Thailand
Asian Games medalists in volleyball
Volleyball players at the 2018 Asian Games
Pornpun Guedpard
Medalists at the 2018 Asian Games
Competitors at the 2019 Southeast Asian Games
Setters (volleyball)
Medalists at the 2013 Summer Universiade
Competitors at the 2021 Southeast Asian Games
Pornpun Guedpard